Tokyo's 13th district is a single-member constituency of the House of Representatives, the lower house of the national Diet of Japan.

It has been held by Shin Tsuchida from the Liberal Democratic Party since 2021.

Members

References 

1994 establishments in Japan
Constituencies established in 1994
Districts of the House of Representatives (Japan)
Politics of Tokyo